State Route 795 (SR 795) is a short state highway in southern Humboldt County, Nevada, United States. One of Nevada's newest state routes, SR 795 (named Reinhart Lane for entire route) primarily serves as a connector road north of Winnemucca.

Route description

(East 2nd Street heads northeast through Weso to end near the south bank of the Humboldt River. East 2nd Street heads southwest as SR 289 to downtown Winnemucca to connect with U.S. Route 95 [US 95].) From its southern terminus, SR 795 heads northwest along Reinhart Lane to cross the Humboldt River.

Just after the river crossing, SR 795 has an intersection with East National Avenue, which heads south-southwest to northwest Winnemucca. (The road continues north-northeast as a dirt road roughly following the course of the river.) (Reinhart Drive continues a bit farther to a T intersection with Sage Heights Drive. US 95 heads south to downtown Winnemucca and north to Oregon and western Idaho.) SR 795, along with SR 289, provides an alternate and more direct connection between northern Humboldt County on US 95 and destinations east on Interstate 80.

History
Prior to becoming a state route in the late 1990s, SR 795 existed as a dirt road maintained by Humboldt County. The route historically served as a shortcut to Winnemucca and was experiencing increasing traffic volumes. The county worked with the Nevada Department of Transportation to bring the road to state highway standards and include it the state highway system.  The newly constructed highway opened in early 1999, and was officially approved as SR 795 on May 1, 1999.

Major intersections

See also

 List of state routes in Nevada
 List of highways numbered 795

Notes

References

External links

795
1795
Transportation in Humboldt County, Nevada